In ancient Roman religion, Abundantia, also called Abundita or Copia, was a divine personification of abundance and prosperity. The name Abundantia means plenty or riches. This name is fitting as Abundantia was a goddess of abundance, money-flow, prosperity, fortune, valuables, and success. She would help protect your savings and investments. Abundantia would even assist someone with major purchases. She was among the embodiments of virtues in religious propaganda that cast the emperor as the ensurer of "Golden Age" conditions. Abundantia thus figures in art, cult, and literature, but has little mythology as such. She may have survived in some form in Roman Gaul and medieval France. Abundantia would carry a cornucopia that was filled with grain and coins. She would occasionally leave some of her grain or money at someone's house as a gift.

In Rome
The Augustan poet Ovid gives Abundantia a role in the myth of Acheloüs the river god, one of whose horns was ripped from his forehead by Hercules. The horn was taken by the Naiads and transformed into the cornucopia that was granted to Abundantia. Other aetiological myths provide different explanations of the cornucopia's origin. On Neronian coinage, she was associated with Ceres and equated with Annona, who embodied the grain supply. Like Annona, Abundantia was a "virtue in action" in such locations as the harbor, where grain entered the city.  Coinage in Rome depicts her either holding the Cornucopia or pouring out the riches contained within the Cornocopia. Occasionally she is depicted as holding wheat or standing on a ship. It is unknown what her appearance on ships represents. This could symbolize the wealth the conquests of the Rome brought to the Empire. Abundantia appears on the medals of many emperors. Such as Trajan, Antoninus Pius, Caracalla, Elagabalus, Severus Alexander, Gordian, Decius, Gallienus, Tetricus, Probus, Numerian, Carinus, Carus, Diocletian, and Galerius. She appears alongside one of several inscriptions: Abundantia, Abundantia Perpetua, Augustorum Nostrorum, Augustorum Augg NN, and Augustia Aug. Mithraic iconography on a vase from Lezoux, in the Roman province of  Gallia Aquitania depicts this deity seating, and holding a cornucopia as a symbol of "the abundance that stems from Mithras' act." Abundantia was depicted on a fountain in Pompeii.

Possible survivals
It has been suggested that the Gallic goddess Rosmerta had a functional equivalence to Abundantia, but the two are never directly identified in inscriptions. William of Auvergne (d. 1249), a bishop of Paris, mentions a Domina Abundia ("Mistress Abundia"), who also appears in the Roman de la Rose as "Dame Habonde." The bishop derives her name from abundantia. At night the dominae enter houses where offerings have been set out for them. They eat and drink from the vessels, but the contents are undiminished. If they are pleased, they bring prosperity and fertility. William regarded these practices as a form of idolatry. Folklorists of the 19th century saw these figures as Celtic fairies.

Nicholas of Cusa reports that on his travels through the French Alps in 1457, he met two old women who told him they were in the service of Domina Abundia. They identified themselves as apostate Christians, and had been imprisoned for witchcraft. Nicholas felt that they had been deluded by the devil, but should be allowed to receive penance rather than burning at the stake.

Later art and allegory
In later Western art, Abundantia is often portrayed holding her cornucopia and sheaves of corn or wheat.

See also
Fortuna
Tyche

References

External links

Abundance goddesses
European folklore characters
French folklore
Personifications in Roman mythology
Roman goddesses